Fancourt is a surname. People with this surname include:

Daisy Fancourt (born 1990), British associate professor of psychobiology and epidemiology
Darrell Fancourt (1886–1953), English bass-baritone and actor
Samuel Fancourt (1678–1768), dissenting minister and projector of circulating libraries
Thomas Fancourt (1840–1919), Archdeacon of Wellington, New Zealand